Syre is an unincorporated community in Home Lake Township, Norman County, Minnesota, United States.

The community is located south of Twin Valley and southeast of Ada at the junction of Minnesota State Highways 32 and 113.

A post office was established at Syre in 1891, and remained in operation until 1936. Syre was a station on the railroad.

References

Further reading
Rand McNally Road Atlas - 2007 edition - Minnesota entry
Official State of Minnesota Highway Map - 2007/2008 edition

Unincorporated communities in Minnesota
Unincorporated communities in Norman County, Minnesota